is a former swimmer from Japan. He finished 6th in the 1500 metres freestyle competition at the 1996 Summer Olympics.

References
 

1975 births
Living people
Olympic swimmers of Japan
Swimmers at the 1996 Summer Olympics
Swimmers at the 2000 Summer Olympics
Asian Games medalists in swimming
Japanese male freestyle swimmers
Asian Games gold medalists for Japan
Asian Games silver medalists for Japan
Swimmers at the 1994 Asian Games
Swimmers at the 1998 Asian Games
Medalists at the 1994 Asian Games
Medalists at the 1998 Asian Games
20th-century Japanese people